Fleming is a large lunar impact crater that is located on the Moon's far side, and cannot be seen from the Earth. It lies about a crater diameter to the east-northeast of Hertz, and to the northwest of Lobachevskiy.

The low rim of this formation is heavily eroded and overlaid by multiple smaller craters. The most notable of these is Fleming along the southern rim, while another, only slightly smaller crater cuts across the lower eastern rim. The interior floor is also marked by a number of small impacts and a few ghost-crater rims.

The crater was named after Alexander and Williamina Fleming. Prior to naming in 1970 by the IAU, this crater was known as Crater 203.

Satellite craters
By convention these features are identified on lunar maps by placing the letter on the side of the crater midpoint that is closest to Fleming.

References

External links

Fleming at The Moon Wiki

Impact craters on the Moon